Hycleus pulchripennis is a species of blister beetles of the family Meloidae that lives in São Tomé and Príncipe. The species was described in 1910. Formerly described as species of the genus Actenodia, it was attributed to Hycleus in 2008.

References

Meloidae
Beetles of Africa
Beetles described in 1910
Insects of São Tomé and Príncipe